The R106 road is a regional road in north Dublin, Ireland.  It runs from Sutton, passing Baldoyle, Portmarnock and Malahide before finishing in Swords.

The official description of the R106 from the Roads Act 1993 (Classification of Regional Roads) Order 2012  reads:

R106: Sutton - Malahide - Swords, County Dublin

Between its junction with R105 at Sutton Cross and its junction with R132 at Swords Demesne via Station Road Sutton; Strand Road, Main Street and Coast Road at Baldoyle; Maynetown, Portmarnock Bridge, The Coast Road, Carrickhill; The Mall, Dublin Road and La Mancha Cross in the town of Malahide; Swords Road and Malahide Road all in the county of Fingal.

See also
Roads in Ireland
National primary road
National secondary road
Regional road

References

Regional roads in the Republic of Ireland
Roads in County Dublin
Roads in Swords, Dublin